94.9 News FM was an FM station owned and operated by Iddes Broadcast Group. Its studio and transmitter are located at Brgy. Bagacay, Alabel, Philippines. The station was on air 24 hours a day. The station's live programs were in Cebuano language.

On November 8, 2017, the station was closed by the Local Government of Alabel due to their non-renewal of permit to operate. Currently, the station is off-air.

Areas of coverage

Primary areas
Alabel, Sarangani Province
General Santos
South Cotabato
Sarangani Province

Secondary areas
some parts of Davao Occidental
some parts of Sultan Kudarat
some parts of Davao del Sur
some parts of North Cotabato
some parts of Davao Oriental
some parts of Bukidnon
some parts of Davao City
Some parts of Pagadian City
some parts of Zamboanga del Sur

Radio stations in General Santos
Radio stations established in 1998
Adult contemporary radio stations in the Philippines